Deborah Hoffmann is an American documentary director and editor. She edited and along with Frances Reid co-directed Long Night's Journey into Day (2000), which won the 2000 Sundance Film Festival Grand Jury award for best documentary and was nominated for the Academy Award for Best Documentary Feature. She also directed the Academy Award-nominated short film, Complaints of a Dutiful Daughter (1995) and was the editor of The Times of Harvey Milk, which won the 1984 Oscar for best documentary.

Selected filmography 
 The Times of Harvey Milk (1984) – editor
 Ethnic Notions (1987) – editor
 Color Adjustment (1992) – editor
 Complaints of a Dutiful Daughter (1995) – director
 Long Night's Journey into Day (2000) – co-director and editor
 The Kill Team (2013) –'' executive producer
 Unrest (2017) – executive producer

References

External links 
 

Living people
American documentary film directors
American film editors
Documentary film editors
1947 births
American women film directors
American women documentary filmmakers